Bobbie Louise Hawkins (July 11, 1930 – May 4, 2018) was a short story writer, monologist, and poet.

Life
Hawkins was born in Abilene in west Texas, to a teenage mother.  She was raised by her mother Nora Hall and her stepfather Harold Hall, with guidance from her grandmother, who would tell her tales of her family.  She spent much of her childhood reading, believing "that the world I read in books existed out there."  The family would later move to Albuquerque, New Mexico, where she would ultimately meet and marry her first husband, Olaf Hoek, a Danish architect.  The couple would soon move to England where she studied art at the Slade School of Fine Arts of the University College London for one year.They would later move to British Honduras, now Belize, where she taught in missionary schools.  She would also attend Sophia University.  The two would later divorce after having two daughters.
She returned to New Mexico where she met Robert Creeley,  a teacher who would later become a famous poet in his own right.  The two soon married.  It was Creeley's position that any wife of a poet would want to write themselves, but derided Hawkins' attempts, to the point that she was "too married, too old, and too late" for her do so.  "I was fighting for the right to write badly until I got better."  Her first book Own Your Body came out in 1973.  Hawkins and Creeley would separate in 1975, after having two more daughters.
Hawkins not only wrote, but she was an accomplished artist.  Her first one-woman show consisting of paintings and collages was at the Gotham Book Mart in 1974.  Many of her artworks would grace the covers her books.
In 1978, Anne Waldman and Allen Ginsberg hired her to teach fiction writing workshops and courses unliterary studies at the Jack Kerouac School of Disembodied Poetics at the Naropa Institute at Boulder, Colorado.  It is now called Naropa University.  She remained at the school until her retirement in 2010. After retiring, she continued to offer readings and teach for Naropa's Summer Writing Program.

She wrote a one-hour play for PBS called "Talk" in 1980.
She released two CD’s, Live at the Great American Music Hall and Jaded Love. 
In 2001, Life As We Know It, a one-woman show, was performed in Boulder and New York City. 
She would publish nineteen books and pieces Inver fifty anthologies and journals.  As part of the Beat Movement, many of her poems feature unconventional construction.  'What's to save his life?" reads more like a brief prose passage, rather than a poem, but it still carries weight and emotion.  Many of her poems are short, such as "trouble and hope," which has only three lines, but showcases the random nature of life, both the good and the bad.  Her ethic might be best explained in another work of hers, "in time I'll do what":—

She was survived by her two daughters from her second marriage, one daughter from her first marriage, and two grandchildren.

Awards
 National Endowment for the Arts Fellowship 1979
 Briarcombe Foundation Residency 1983

Works
"life in Bolinas: Bobbie Louise Hawkins, laborin'", article
[http://www.bigbridge.org/issue11/fictbhawkins.htm "Panna: 1. Cyril in Texas", Big Bridge #11]
"In the Colony", Ploughshares, Spring 1974
"I Owe You One", Ploughshares, Spring 1974 (also recorded on "Live at the Great American Music Hall, 1981 w/Terry Garthwaite and Rosalie Sorrels)
"Bathroom/Animal/Castration Story", Ploughshares, Spring 1974

 

 
 
 
 
 Back to Texas (Bearhug) 1977
 ; republished by Belladonna (New York, 2010); .
 Own Your Body'', Black Sparrow Press, 1973

Anthologies

Interview
"George Oppen, Mary Oppen and a Poem", Jacket 36, 2008

References

External links
"Music: Garthwaite, Hawkins and Sorrels weave folklore" New York Times, by Stephen Holden, September 26, 1983
"Monologue, "Take Love, For Instance" ", Naropa's Summer Writing Program, 2004
"1990 Bobbie Louise Hawkins - First Story", PRX

1930 births
2018 deaths
American women short story writers
American short story writers
Sophia University alumni
American women poets
21st-century American women
People from Abilene, Texas